Jeanne-Angélique Boquet, sometimes Bocquet, was a French pastellist who was active around 1774.

She worked at the latter place as well, copying portraits. Her husband was Jean Charny, vernisseur de Monsieur. Boquet was related to a number of artists, and was cousin to the pastellist Rosalie Filleul.

References

French women painters
18th-century French painters
18th-century French women artists
Painters from Paris
Year of death unknown
Pastel artists